Javier Naranjo Solano (born 10 June 1983) is a Chilean lawyer and current Minister for the Environment.

References

1983 births
Living people
Politicians from Santiago
Pontifical Catholic University of Chile alumni
Andrés Bello National University alumni
Environment ministers
Government ministers of Chile